The Latin Grammy Award for Best Pop Vocal Album (awarded as Best Contemporary Pop Vocal Album until 2019) is an award presented by the Latin Academy of Recording Arts & Sciences. It began to be presented at the 2012 ceremony. The awards replaced the previous awards for Best Female Pop Vocal Album, Best Male Pop Vocal Album and Best Pop Album by a Duo or Group with Vocals. According to the Latin Grammy description guide it is designed "For albums containing 51% or more playing time of newly recorded (previously unreleased) material and 51%playing time of Contemporary Pop music. Albums must also contain 51% or more playing time of vocal tracks. For solo artists, duos or groups." 

Alejandro Sanz and Jesse & Joy are the only artists to win this category twice. Alejandro Sanz is also the most nominated artist in this category with three nominations. 

In 2012, ¿Con Quién Se Queda El Perro? by Jesse & Joy won this award and it was nominated for Album of the Year; it also was nominated for the Best Latin Pop Album category at the 2013 Grammy Awards.

In 2013, La Música No Se Toca by Alejandro Sanz, Papitwo by Miguel Bosé and  Vida by Draco Rosa, all were nominated for this award and for Album of the Year. Sanz received the award, and Vida by Draco Rosa won Album of the Year; Vida also won for Best Latin Pop Album, and was nominated alongside Syntek by Aleks Syntek at the 56th Annual Grammy Awards.

In 2014, Elypse by Camila won this award and was nominated for Album of the Year. Also, they were nominated for the Best Latin Pop Album category at the 57th Annual Grammy Awards.

In 2015, Sirope by Alejandro Sanz won this award and was nominated for Album of the Year. Also, Sirope, Terral by Pablo Alborán and A Quien Quiera Escuchar by Ricky Martin, all were nominated for the Best Latin Pop Album category at the 58th Annual Grammy Awards.

In 2016, Tour Terral: Tres Noches en Las Ventas by  Pablo Alborán and Un Besito Más by Jesse & Joy , both were nominated for this award and for Album of the Year.

In 2017, El Dorado by Shakira won this award and was nominated for Album of the Year.

In 2019, #ElDisco by Alejandro Sanz and Fantasía by Sebastián Yatra were nominated for this award and Album of the Year. El Mal Querer by Rosalía became the first album to win this award and Album of The Year. In 2020, the award was disestablished and the Best Pop Vocal Album returned after being folded in 2000.

Winners and nominees

2010s

See also
Latin Grammy Award for Best Traditional Pop Vocal Album

References

External links
Official site of the Latin Grammy Awards

 
 Pop Vocal Album
Awards established in 2012
Awards disestablished in 2019